Phyllis Hyman is the self-titled solo debut studio album by American soul singer-songwriter Phyllis Hyman. It was released by Buddah Records in 1977. The album charted at number 107 on the Billboard 200 chart, and of the singles released from the album, "No One Can Love You More" was the most successful, charting at number 58 in the Billboard Hot Soul singles chart.

Album information
After recording a cover version of The Stylistics' 1971 hit "Betcha by Golly, Wow" that appeared on Norman Connors' 1976 You Are My Starship album, Hyman was signed to Buddah and began work on her debut. The album featured the hits "Loving You – Losing You", and "I Don't Want to Lose You", an R&B ballad (originally recorded by The Spinners). Phyllis Hyman has since been re-issued on CD. This re-issue is out of print; however, eight of the tracks are available on The Best of Phyllis Hyman – The Buddah Years, issued by Sequel Records in 1990.
In 1996 RCA records issued the CD Loving You, Losing You, The Classic Balladry of Phyllis Hyman, which included a previously unreleased track from the 1977 recording session, "Sounds Like a Love Song".

Track listing
Side One:
 "Loving You – Losing You" (Thom Bell) – 7:41
 "No One Can Love You More" (Skip Scarborough) – 4:20
 "One Thing on My Mind"  (Evie Sands, Richard Germinaro) – 5:30
 "I Don't Want to Lose You" (Thom Bell, Linda Creed) – 5:31
 "Deliver the Love" (Onaje Allan Gumbs, Ausar Sahw Rachim) 3:02
Side Two:
 "Was Yesterday Such a Long Time Ago" (M. Goode, Buddy Scott) – 4:55
 "Night Bird Gets the Love" (Muhyi Shakoor, Clifford Carter) – 4:20
 "Beautiful Man of Mine" (Larry Alexander) – 6:20
 "Children of the World" (Hubert Eaves III) – 2:55

Personnel
Phyllis Hyman - vocals
 Larry Alexander – backing vocals
 Maxine Anderson – backing vocals
 Gary Bartz - alto saxophone
 Errol "Crusher" Bennett – percussion
 Carla Benson – Backing vocals
 Evette Benton – Backing vocals
 Hiram Bullock – guitar
 Cecil Bridgewater – trumpet
 Charles Collins – drums
 Ann Esther – backing vocals
 John Davis – keyboards, arranger
 Hubert Eaves III – piano, Moog synthesizer, arranger
 Scott Edwards – bass guitar
 Michael "Sugar Bear" Foreman – bass guitar
 Jim Gilstrap – backing vocals
 Onaje Allan Gumbs – piano, keyboards, arranger, conductor
 Billy Harner – backing vocals
 Dennis Harris – guitar
 Barbara Ingram – backing vocals
 Anthony Jackson – bass guitar
 Virgil Jones – trumpet
 Steve Jordan – drums
 Will Lee – bass guitar
 John Lehman – backing vocals
 Victor Lewis – drums
 Bill Lowe – trombone
 Reggie Lucas – guitar
 Harvey Mason, Sr. – timpani
 Andy Newmark – drums
 Jerry Peters – keyboards, arranger
 Greg Poree – guitar
 Raymond Pounds – drums
 Janice Robinson – trombone
 Richie Rome – keyboards
 John Rowin – guitar
 Skip Scarborough – keyboards
 Craig Snyder – guitar
 Jerry Steinholtz – drums
 Charles Sullivan – trumpet
 Sandy Torano – guitar, backing vocals
 Larry Washington – percussion
Nathan Watts - bass guitar
 Gregory Williams – French horn
 Kiane Zawadi – trombone

Production
 Producers: Larry Alexander, John Davis, Jerry Peters, Sandy Torano
 Arrangers: John Davis, Jerry Peters, Onaje Allan Gumbs
 Engineer: Fred Torchio
 Production Coordination: Bernadette Fauver
 Liner Notes: David Nathan
 Art Direction: Milton Sincoff
 Photography: Joel Brodsky
 Executive Producer: Lewis Merenstein

References

External links
 

1977 debut albums
Buddah Records albums
Phyllis Hyman albums
Albums produced by Jerry Peters
Albums with cover art by Joel Brodsky
Albums recorded at Total Experience Recording Studios